The blackstripe barb (Enteromius macrops) is a species of cyprinid fish in the genus Enteromius which is widely distributed in West Africa where it is harvested for human consumption.

References 

 

Enteromius
Cyprinid fish of Africa
Fish described in 1911
Taxa named by George Albert Boulenger